List of people surnamed Zhang is a list, which records the people who used to be surnamed Zhang.

Historical figures
 Zhang Yi (died 309 BC), strategist in the Warring States period
 Zhang Han (died 205 BC), military general of the Qin dynasty 
 Zhang Tang (died 116 BC), official of the Western Han dynasty under Emperor Wu
 Zhang Anshi, son of Zhang Tang, official of the Han dynasty
 Zhang Liang (died 186 BC), adviser to Liu Bang (founding emperor of the Han dynasty).
 Zhang Jue, leader of the Yellow Turban Rebellion in the Eastern Han dynasty
 Zhang Rang (died 189), leader of the eunuch faction during the reign of Emperor Ling in the Eastern Han dynasty
 Zhang Lu (died 216), 3rd Celestial Master of Zhengyi Dao Order and political leader during Eastern Han dynasty
 Zhang Fei (died 221), general of the Shu Han state in the Three Kingdoms period
 Zhang Hong (153–212), official serving under the warlord Sun Quan in the Eastern Han dynasty
 Zhang Yi (died 230), general of the Shu Han state in the Three Kingdoms period
 Empress Zhang (died 237), Empress of the Shu Han state in the Three Kingdoms period
 Zhang He (died 231), general of the Cao Wei state in the Three Kingdoms period
 Zhang Liao (169–222), general of the Cao Wei state in the Three Kingdoms period
 Zhang Zhao (156–238), official of the Eastern Wu state in the Three Kingdoms period
 Zhang Chunhua (died 247), wife of the Cao Wei general Sima Yi in the Three Kingdoms period
 Zhang Ni (died 254), general of the Shu Han state in the Three Kingdoms period
 Zhang Yi (died 264), general of the Shu Han state in the Three Kingdoms period
 Zhang Bu (died 264), general of the Eastern Wu state in the Three Kingdoms period
 Zhang Hua (232–300), Western Jin dynasty official and poet.
Zhang Mao (277–324), founder of Former Liang in the Sixteen Kingdoms period
Zhang Ci (died 386), general and eunuch of the Former Qin state in the Sixteen Kingdoms period
 Zhang Liang, general and official of the Tang dynasty
 Zhang Yue (663–730), Tang dynasty chancellor and poet
 Zhang Jiuling (673–740), Tang dynasty chancellor and poet
 Zhang Jun (1086–1154), general of the Song dynasty
 Zhang Jiucheng (1092–1159), court official
 Zhang Hongfan (1238–1280), Yuan dynasty general
 Zhang Sicheng (died 1344), 39th Celestial Master of Zhengyi Dao Order during the Yuan dynasty, known for his calligraphy
 Zhang Juzheng (1525–1582), Ming dynasty statesman

Science and mathematics
 Zhang Heng (78–139), Chinese scientist, mathematician and polymath who invented the first earthquake detector during the Han dynasty
Yi Xing (683–727, birthname: Zhang Sui), Chinese mathematician, astronomer and mechanical engineer born during the Tang dynasty,  calculated the number of possible positions on a go board game
 Zhang Shoucheng (1963–2018), American theoretical physicist
 Zhang Shouwu (born 1962) Chinese-American mathematician
 Zhang Yitang (born 1955), Chinese-American mathematician
Zhang Jie, Chinese physicist
Liangchi Zhang (born 1958), Chinese Australian mechanical engineer and scientist
John Zhang (born 1958), medical scientist in fertility research, and in vitro fertilization. Produced the world's first three-parent baby using the spindle transfer technique in 2016 
Feng Zhang (born 1982), neuroscientist and biomedical engineer in optogenetics and CRISPR technologies
Guoqi Zhang speciality in electronics
Huaguang Zhang speciality in electronics
Jianzhong Zhang speciality in electronics
Junshan Zhang speciality in electronics
Wen-Hao Zhang plant physiologist and nutritionist
Wenjun Zhang speciality in electronics
Zhijun Zhang speciality in electronics

Government and military
 Cheong Weng Chon (born 1966), Macau administrator
 Zhang Aiping (1908–2003), Chinese communist military leader
 Zhang Chunqiao (1917–2005), member of the Gang of Four
 Zhang Dingfan (1891–1945), Chinese general
 Zhang Guohua (1914–1972), PLA　general in the Battle of Chamdo and the Sino-Indian War
 Zhang Shicheng (1321–1367), Red Turban Rebellion leader
 Zhang Tiesheng Communist politician
 Zhang Tingyu (1672–1755), Qing dynasty politician
 Zhang Wentian (1900–1976), former General Secretary of the Chinese Communist Party
 Zhang Xueliang (1901–2001), Manchurian warlord and Zhang Zuolin's son
 Zhang Zhidong (1837–1909), Qing dynasty politician
 Zhang Zizhong (1891–1940), NRA general
 Zhang Zongchang (1881–1932), Shandong warlord
 Zhang Zuolin (1873–1928), Manchurian warlord

Entertainment
 Chang Cheh, Chinese film director.
 Chang Chia-hang, Taiwanese online personality
 Zhang Yimou (born 1951), Chinese film director and former cinematographer
Zhang Guoli (born 1955), Chinese actor and film director
 Zhang Yuan (born 1963), Chinese film director
 Zhang Hanyu (born 1964), Chinese actor
 Zhang Yang (born 1967), Chinese film director, screenwriter, and occasional actor
 Jason Zhang (born 1982), Chinese pop singer
 Jane Zhang (born 1984), Chinese pop singer
 Zhang Zhenhuan (born 1984), Chinese actor and MediaCorp artiste based in Singapore
 Zhang Xianzi (born 1986), Chinese singer
 Zhang Yu (born 1988), Chinese voice actress
 Baby Zhang (Zhang Hanyun) (born 1989), Chinese singer and runner-up of the singing contest Super Girl
 Zhang Liyin (born 1989), Chinese singer active in China and South Korea
 Zhang Haochen (born 1990), Chinese pianist
Zhang Zhehan (born 1991), Chinese actor
 Zhang Yixing (born 1991), (known as Lay) Chinese singer, dancer, rapper and songwriter, member of the South Korean group EXO
 Zhang Xincheng aka Stevan Zhang (born 1995), Chinese actor, model, singer.
 Chelsea Zhang (born 1996), American actress
 Zhang Yuge (born 1996), Chinese idol singer and member of female idol group SNH48
 Zhang Zining (born 1996), Chinese singer, member of girl groups MERA and Rocket Girls 101
 Zhang Zhenyuan (born 2003), Chinese singer, member of Teens in Times

Writers
 Zhang Chao (1600–?), Qing dynasty literature and fiction writer
 Zhang Chengzhi (born 1948), Hui Muslim writer and author of History of the Soul
 Zhang Dai (1597–1689), Ming dynasty writer and historian
 Zhang Lijia (born 1964), Chinese writer and author of "Socialism is Great!"
 Zhang Tianyi (1906–1985), Chinese left-wing writer and children's author
 Zhang Hongliang (born 1955), Chinese Maoist writer, scholar and social commentator
 Zhang Jialong (born 1988), Chinese journalist
 Zhang Renxi 17th century Chinese poetical critic
 Lifen Zhang (born 1962), British-Chinese journalist, author and broadcaster
 Zhang Xinxin (writer) (born 1953), Chinese writer
 Zhang Yousong (1903–1995, Chinese translator
 Zhang Zhu (1287–1386), Chinese poet
Zhang Zao (1962–2010), Chinese poet

Sports
 Zhang Bing (born 1969), Chinese sports shooter
 Caroline Zhang (born 1993), American figure skater
 Zhang Dan (born 1985), Chinese pair skater, Zhang Hao's partner
 Zhang Hao (born 1984), Chinese pair skater, Zhang Dan's partner
 Zhang Hong Wei, Chinese paralympic athlete
 Zhang Huimin (born 1999), Chinese female athlete
 Zhang Jin (born 2000), Chinese artistic gymnast
 Zhang Juanjuan (born 1981), Chinese archer
 Zhang Jun (born 1977), Chinese badminton coach and former badminton player
 Zhang Lianbiao (born 1969), Chinese retired javelin thrower
 Zhang Lijun (born 1996), Chinese female curler
 Zhang Ning (born 1975), Chinese badminton player
 Rose Zhang, American golfer
Zhang Guowei (high jumper), Chinese high jumper
 Zhang Shan Qi (born 1991), Chinese racecar driver 
 Zhang Shuai (born 1989), Chinese tennis player
 Zhang Shuxian (born 2000), Chinese badminton player
 Zhang Tianjie (born 1992), a naturalized Japanese basketball player who later changed his name to Tenketsu Harimoto
 Zhang Tiequan (born 1978), Chinese martial artist
 Zhang Weili (born 1989), Chinese mixed martial artist
 Zhang Xi (born 1985), Chinese beach volleyball player
 Zhang Yining (born 1981), Chinese table tennis player
 Zhang Yufei (born 1998), competitive swimmer
 Zhang Yufei (born 1988), gymnast and gymnastics coach
 Zhang Yuning (born 1976), Chinese footballer
 Zhang Jike (born 1989), Chinese table tennis player

Others
 Zhang Baokang or Sheng-yen (1930–2009), Chinese Buddhist monk and religious scholar, founder of the "Dharma Drum Mountain"
 Zhang Daoling or Zhang Tianshi (34–156), First Celestial Master and founder of the Taoist Order known as "Tian Shi Dao" or "Zhengyi Dao"
 Zhang Daqian (1899–1983) Chinese artist
 Zhang Guoxiang, 50th Celestial Master of Zhengyi Dao Order 
 Zhang Hongbao (1954–2006), founder and spiritual leader of Zhong Gong
 Zhang Huaxiang, Chinese nurse murdered in Singapore
 Zhang Luqin or Master Yin Shun (1906–2005), well-known Buddhist monk and scholar who bring forth Humanistic Buddhism
 Zhang Mingxuan Chinese clergyman and president of the Chinese House Church Alliance
 Zhang Qian (200–114 BC), Han dynasty diplomat and explorer
 Zhang Qiulin (born 1964), Chinese French contralto opera singer
 Zhang Sanfeng, semi-mythical Taoist sage in the Yuan and Ming dynasties
 Zhang Xiao (born 1981), Chinese photographer
 Zhang Yufeng (born 1945), former personal secretary of Mao Zedong 
 Zhang Zeduan (1085–1145), Chinese painter
 Zhang Zhan (born 1983), Chinese lawyer and citizen journalist
 Zhang Zhongjing, (150–219), Han dynasty physician
 Zhang Zilin (born 1984), winner of Miss World 2007
 James X. Zhang, American health economist and academic
 Xinyu Zhang (born 1955), Chinese businessman
 Zhang Meng, Chinese murder victim killed in Singapore
Zhang Yingying, Chinese exchange student who was kidnapped and murdered in the United States

Fictional and mythological characters
 Frank Zhang, Roman demigod sired by Mars in The Heroes of Olympus series by Rick Riordan
 Elder Zhang Guo (Zhang Guolao), one of the Eight Immortals in Chinese mythology
 Zhang Taiyan, grandmaster of Hokuto Sōkaken in the manga and anime series Fist of the Blue Sky
 Zhang Wuji, the protagonist of the wuxia novel The Heaven Sword and Dragon Saber by Jin Yong (Louis Cha)

Chang
 Angela Chang, Taiwanese singer and actress.
 Chang Cheh, Hong Kong film director
 Chang Chen-yue or "A-Yue", Taiwanese rock musician.
 Chang Ching-sen (born 1959), Governor of Fujian Province
 Chang Fei or "Fei Ge", Taiwanese television personality.
 Chang Jin-fu (born 1948), Governor of Taiwan Province (2009–2010)
 Chang King-yuh (born 1937), Minister of Mainland Affairs Council of the Republic of China (1996–1999)
 Chang Liang-jen (born 1946), Deputy Minister of National Defense of the Republic of China (2008–2009)
 Chang Li-shan (born 1964), Magistrate-elect of Yunlin County
 Chang San-cheng (born 1954), Premier of the Republic of China (2016)
 Chang Tzi-chin, Deputy Magistrate of Taipei County (2005–2006)
 Chen Chung Chang (1927–2014), mathematician
 Deserts Chang, Taiwanese singer/songwriter.
 Feiping Chang, Taiwanese-born Hong Kong socialite and fashion blogger
 Edmond E-min Chang (born 1970), Taiwanese American former lawyer and current federal district judge for northern Illinois, appointed by President Obama in 2010
 Eileen Chang (1920–1995), Chinese writer
 Erchen Chang, Taiwanese chef
 Eva Fong Chang (1897–1991), American artist
 Chang Hui-mei or "A-mei", aboriginal Taiwanese singer and occasional songwriter.
 Iris Chang (1968–2004), American historian and journalist
 Jeff Chang, Taiwanese singer
 Jung Chang, Chinese writer and author of Wild Swans
 Chang Kai-chen (born 1991), Taiwanese tennis player
 Kathleen Chang, birth name of Kathy Change, a political activist who committed suicide by self-immolation at the University of Pennsylvania in 1996
 Katharine Chang, Chairperson of Straits Exchange Foundation
 Chang King Hai Chinese international footballer in 1948 Olympics
 Li Fung Chang, Taiwanese communications engineer
 Michael Te-Pei Chang (born 1972), Chinese American tennis player
 Peng Chun Chang (1892–1957), Chinese professor, philosopher, and playwright who played a pivotal role in drafting the Universal Declaration of Human Rights
 Phil Chang, Taiwanese singer-songwriter and television personality
 Shi-Kuo Chang, Taiwanese computer scientist and science fiction author
 Tseng Chang (1930–2021), Chinese American actor
 Victor Chang (1936–1991), Chinese-Australian cardiac surgeon
 Chang Yu-sheng (1966–1997), Taiwanese singer, composer, and producer

Cheong
 Cheong Chun Yin (张俊炎; born 1984), Malaysian drug trafficker and life convict in Singapore
 Cheong Fatt Tze (1840–1916), Chinese businessman and politician
 Cheong Yoke Choy (1873–1958), Chinese-Malaysian philanthropist
 Cheong Choong Kong (born 1941), Malaysian businessman, former CEO of Singapore Airlines
 Cheong Liew (born 1949), Malaysian-Australian chef
 Cheong Kuoc Vá (born 1956), Macau politician
 Cheong Koon Hean (born 1957), Singaporean urban planner and architect
 Cheong U (born 1957), Macau politician
 Cheong Chia Chieh (born c. 1972), Malaysian businessman
 Cheong Jun Hoong (born 1990), Malaysian diver

Cheung
 Andrew Cheung (born 1961), Hong Kong judge and jurist
 Cecilia Cheung (born 1980), Hong Kong actress and singer
 Cheung Chi Doy (born 1941), Hong Kong-born footballer who represented Republic of China (Taiwan)
 Cheung Chi Wai (born 1946), Hong Kong-born footballer who represented Republic of China (Taiwan) 
 Dicky Cheung (born 1965), Hong Kong actor and singer
 Jacky Cheung (born 1961), Hong Kong actor and singer
 Karin Anna Cheung (born 1974), American actress, singer, and songwriter
 Leslie Cheung (1956–2003), Hong Kong actor and musician
 Louis Cheung (born 1980), Hong Kong actor, singer, and songwriter
 Maggie Cheung (born 1964), Hong Kong-British actress
 Margaret Chung (1889–1959), American physician
 Rachel Cheung (born 1991), Hong Kong classical pianist
 Sharla Cheung or Cheung Man (born 1967), Hong Kong actress
 Steven Ng-Sheong Cheung (born 1935), Chinese economist
 Cheung Tat-ming (born 1964), Hong Kong actor, comedian, director, and writer
 Teresa Cheung (born 1959), Hong Kong singer
 Cheung Ka Long (born 1997), Fencing

Teo
 Teo Chee Hean (张志贤; born 1954), Singaporean politician, Senior Minister 
 Teo Cheng Kiat (张振杰; born 1953), Singaporean white-collar criminal
 Josephine Teo Li Min (杨莉明; born 1968), Singaporean politician, Minister for Communications and Information
 Nicholas Teo (Chinese: 張棟樑; born 1981), Malaysian Chinese singer based in Taiwan
 Teo Nie Ching (張念群; born 1981), Malaysian politician, Deputy Minister of Education (2018–2020)
 Teo Ser Luck (张思乐; born 1968) Singaporean politician, Mayor of North East District (2009–2017)
 Felicia Teo Wei Ling (张玮凌; 1988–2007), Singaporean student who was presumed missing in 2007 before she was revealed to be murdered
 Teo Ghim Heng (张锦兴; born 1976), Singaporean convicted killer who killed his pregnant wife and daughter 
 Teo Zi Ning (张芷宁; 2013–2017), Singaporean murder victim who was killed by her father Teo Ghim Heng
 Winnifred Teo Suan Lie (张碹丽 Zhāng Xuànlì; 1967–1985), Singaporean student and victim of an unsolved rape and murder case

Tiong
 Tiong Hiew King (born 1935), Chinese Malaysian businessman
 Tiong King Sing (born 1961), Chinese Malaysian politician

Tjong
 Tjong A Fie or Tjong Yiauw Hian (1860–1921), Indonesian businessman, philanthropist, banker and Chinese Kapitan of Medan

Mother of Mencius

Surnames